Nikolay Nikolayevich Artamonov (1906–1965) was a Soviet rocket engineer, a member of the Gas Dynamics Laboratory.

A Moon crater, Artamonov, is named after him.

References

Soviet engineers
20th-century Russian engineers
1906 births
1965 deaths
Date of birth missing
Date of death missing